It's a Mother is the twenty-sixth full-length studio album by American musician James Brown. The album was released in August 1969, by King Records.

Track listing

References

1969 albums
James Brown albums
Albums produced by James Brown
King Records (United States) albums